The 2012–13 BYU-Hawaii Seasiders men's basketball team represented BYU-Hawaii in the 2012–13 NCAA Division II college basketball season. It was head coach Ken Wagner's twenty-third season at BYU-Hawaii. The Seasiders are members of the Pacific West Conference and played their home games at the George Q. Cannon Activities Center. The Seasiders finished the season 16–11. They qualified for the first ever Pac West Tournament, where they lost in the semi-finals to Dixie State.

2012–13 media
The Seasiders had every home game televised in various fashions. All home games were shown on BYUtv Sports or on the BYU-Hawaii Seasiders Livestream Channel. All road games had an internet audio broadcast available through BYU-Hawaii Radio, and some road games were streamed online through the opposition's online video providers.

Recruiting

Roster

Schedule

|-
!colspan=12 style="background:#FFCC00; color:#990000;"| Exhibition

|-
!colspan=12 style="background:#990000; color:#FFCC00;"| Regular Season

|-
!colspan=12 style="background:#FFCC00; color:#990000;"| 2013 Pacific West Conference Tournament

Game Summaries

Exhibition: Ningbo University
Series History: First Meeting

Exhibition: New Zealand Maori

#6 Western Washington
Broadcasters: Lad Panis and Dave Porter

Central Washington
Broadcasters: Lad Panis and Dave Porter

#9 Seattle Pacific
Broadcasters: Lad Panis and Dave Porter

Oakland City
Broadcasters: Lad Panis and Dave Porter

Montana State-Billings
Broadcasters: Lad Panis and Dave Porter

Hawaii Pacific
Broadcasters: Lad Panis and Dave Porter

Urbana (OH)
Broadcasters: Lad Panis and Dave Porter

at Long Beach State
Broadcaster: Lad Panis (BYU-Hawaii Radio)/ Rob Brender (BigWest.TV & Long Beach State on Stretch)

Holy Names
Broadcasters: Lad Panis and Dave Porter

Notre Dame de Namur
Broadcasters: Lad Panis and Dave Porter

Academy of Art
Broadcasters: Lad Panis and Dave Porter

at Dominican
Broadcaster: Lad Panis (BYU-Hawaii Radio)/ Stuart Horne and Patrick Cayabyab (Dominican on Stretch & Dominican Radio)

at Holy Names
Broadcaster: Lad Panis (BYU-Hawaii Radio)/ Wendell Tull (Hawk Sports onDemand)

at Notre Dame de Namur
Broadcaster: Lad Panis (BYU-Hawaii Radio)/ ??? (America One)

at Fresno Pacific
Broadcaster: Lad Panis (BYU-Hawaii Radio)/ Christian Lukens and Rick Bough (Fresno Pacific on Stretch)

at Hawaii-Hilo
Broadcaster: Lad Panis (BYU-Hawaii Radio)/ Josh Pacheco and Stan Costales (Hawaii- Hilo on Boxcast & ESPN Hawaii- KHLO & KKON)

Chaminade
Broadcasters: Lad Panis and Dave Porter

at Hawaii Pacific
Broadcaster: Lad Panis (BYU-Hawaii Radio)/ Brent Curry (HPU on Stretch)

at Chaminade
Broadcaster: Lad Panis (BYU-Hawaii Radio)/ Felipe Orozco (GoSwords.com)

Point Loma Nazarene
Broadcasters: Lad Panis and Dave Porter

Cal Baptist
Broadcasters: Lad Panis and Scott Lowe

Azusa Pacific
Broadcasters: Lad Panis and Dave Porter

at Dixie State
Broadcaster: Lad Panis (BYU-Hawaii Radio)/ Parker Craycroft, Kylee Young, and Taylor Deckard (CEC-TV), John Potter (ESPN 1210 AM, 102.3 FM, & 107.3 FM- KXFF)

at Grand Canyon
Broadcaster: Lad Panis (BYU-Hawaii Radio)/ Michael Potter and Dan Nichols (GCULopes.com & Grand Canyon Sidearm Sports)

Hawaii-Hilo
Broadcasters: Lad Panis and Dave Porter

Pac-West Quarterfinals: vs. 4-seed Dominican
Broadcaster: Lad Panis (BYU-Hawaii Radio)

Pac-West Semi-finals: vs. 1-seed Dixie State
Broadcaster: Lad Panis (BYU-Hawaii Radio)

References

BYU–Hawaii Seasiders men's basketball seasons
2012 in sports in Hawaii
2013 in sports in Hawaii
BYU